The granny hair trend (also known as Granny gray) is a new phenomenon of young women coloring their hair to different shades of gray. It emerged in the second decade of the 21st century.

For centuries, people have tried to hide graying hair with methods like dyeing, coloring and henna since gray hair appears most often on older adults and aging is stigmatized in most Western societies. A recent beauty trend has seen women defying stereotypes and opting to leave graying hair natural or purposely gray their hair prematurely.

The trend is attributed to fashion designer Jean-Paul Gaultier, whose Autumn/Winter 2011 show featured models in grey Beehives. In Spring 2015, his catwalk show at Paris Fashion Week featuring silver haired models as did the shows of other fashion designers Chanel and Gareth Pugh. Ellie Goulding was seen in 2011 with platinum hair that was shaded towards grey instead of white or blond. Kelly Osbourne was also an early proponent of the look, sporting gray hair as early as 2012. Over the next few years, many celebrities like Lady Gaga, Pink, Rihanna, Nicole Ritchie and Dascha Polanco also tried out this new trend. By the summer of 2015, gray and pastel colors were regularly requested at salons, showing the growing popularity of the look. This same year, the website Bored Panda asked women to post their photos in gray hairstyles and that page has since then received over 600,000 views.

Two groups emerged; young people changing their hair color and the older generation eager to embrace their natural grays. Something previously perceived as a feature that needs to be hidden, considered a flaw of aging, was embraced as desirable and beautiful. Movie stars Dame Judi Dench and Jamie Lee Curtis also wore more natural tones.

Coloring hair gray often requires the use of dyeing as well as bleaching the hair and both the practices are damaging to the health of the hair. To achieve the look prior to naturally graying, hair must first bleached until it's white. Then tones of gray, blue or violet are added. If the color isn't made light enough, the hair will take on a green tone instead of gray. Maintaining the look of artificially gray hair requires a lot of maintenance to avoid regrowth. Frequent toning is required since silver and grey hair can look blond after a few weeks.

References

Hairstyles